Conochuza is a monotypic moth genus of the family Noctuidae. Its only species, Conochuza lineola, is known from the Seychelles (Aldabra island). Both the genus and species were first described by Emilio Berio in 1962.

References

Amphipyrinae
Monotypic moth genera